Cedar Park station is a commuter rail station operated by Exo in Pointe-Claire, Quebec. It is served by the exo1 (Vaudreuil-Dorion) line.

 on weekdays, 10 of 11 inbound trains and 10 of 12 outbound trains on the line call at this station; the others skip this stop. On weekends, all trains (four on Saturday and three on Sunday in each direction) call here.

The station is located north of Autoroute 20, about 250 m west of Boulevard Saint-Jean. It has two side platforms; access between them is provided by a walkway tunnel with a headhouse on either side. The tunnel also gives access to an open-air walkway south of the station that passes under the highway and two of its ramps to connect with Cedar Avenue on the south side of the highway.

A station was located here by 1909.

Bus connections

References

External links
 Cedar Park Commuter Train Station Information (RTM)
 Cedar Park Commuter Train Station Schedule (RTM)
 2016 STM System Map

Exo commuter rail stations
Buildings and structures in Pointe-Claire
Railway stations in Montreal
Transport in Pointe-Claire